Pahonia is the coat of arms of Lithuania.

Pahonia may also refer to:

 Pahonia, a national emblem of Belarus
 "Pahonia", a 1916 poem by Maksim Bahdanovič
 Pahonia (song), a Belarusian song based on Bahdanovič's poem
 Pahonia Detachment, a group of Belarusian opposition volunteers, which was formed to defend Ukraine against the war in Donbass
 Pahonia Regiment, a group of Belarusian opposition volunteers, which was formed to defend Ukraine against the 2022 Russian invasion